Smruthi Venkat is an Indian actress who appears predominantly in Tamil language films. She made her acting debut with 2019 commercially success film Thadam.

Career 
Smruthi made her career in a uncredited role in the film Indru Netru Naalai (2015).

Smruthi Venkat appeared in Thadam, alongside Arun Vijay. The movie opened to some good reviews both commercially and critically. The News Minutes critic wrote, "Smruthi have limited screen space but manage to leave an impression with their competent performances. After Thadam, she acted in another Tamil film with Sathyaraj titled Theerpugal Virkapadum, which had a delayed release in 2021. After that, Smruthi  was signed for a major role in Mookuthi Amman. After the success of Mookuthi Amman, Smruthi went on to play a role in Dhanush's 43rd film, Maaran directed by Karthick Naren. Apart from films, Smruthi has done some commercial advertisements such as Levista (coffee), Kalyan Jewellers,Tanishq and She also acted in Rap Rakesh Sethulingam Music Video titled "12 AM"  Song on Woman Empowerment, Which was Released by Actor Vijay Sethupathi.

Filmography

Television series

Music Videos

References 

Indian actresses
Living people